Giorgi Saakadze the Grand Mouravi (c. 1570 – October 3, 1629) was a Georgian politician and military commander who played an important but contradictory role in the politics of the early 17th-century Georgia. He was also known as Grand Mouravi (დიდი მოურავი, didi mouravi) in Georgia, Mūrāv-Beg in Persia and Māūrāv-Hūn or Māġrāv-Bek in the Ottoman Empire for having served as a mouravi (appointed royal official which can be rendered by seneschal or bailiff) of Tbilisi.

Biography 
Giorgi Saakagze was born in 1570 in Noste village (Peli village by other sources), near the town on Kaspi. Saakadze's family came of the untitled nobility (samepo aznauri). His father, Siaush, rose in prominence through a loyal service to King Simon I of Kartli, whom Giorgi joined in military service in his early career. Under the young king Luarsab II, he was appointed a mourav of Tbilisi, Tskhinvali, and Dvaleti in 1608. Saakadze's influence and prestige especially grew after he destroyed an Ottoman invasion force at the battle of Tashiskari in June 1609, thereby saving Luarsab from being dislodged. In 1611, the king married Saakadze's sister, Macrine, annoying the great nobles, who grew increasingly suspicious of the ambitious and aspiring officer who had risen from the ranks of the petty nobility to become the most powerful man in Kartli. The animosity between the two nobles parties centered on the princes P’arsadan Tsitsishvili and Shadiman Baratashvili on one hand, and Saakadze on the other. The nobles convinced Luarsab that Saakadze was an Iranian traitor, prompting him to divorce Macrine and authorize a plot to kill him in May 1612. Saakadze escaped the trap and defected to Iran. Having converted to Islam and displayed his military ability in Iran's war with the Ottomans, he quickly won the confidence of Shah Abbas I of Iran and was regularly consulted on the Georgian affairs.

In 1614, Saakadze avenged Luarsab and his nobles by aiding Shah Abbas in the invasion of Georgia which brought Luarsab's reign to an end, but dissuaded the Iranians from committing atrocities in Kartli after the nation surrendered. In 1619, the shah appointed him a vekil (regent) to Bagrat Khan, the Iranian nominee to the throne of Kartli. Saakadze turned into a de facto ruler of Kartli. Once the hostilities with the Ottomans resumed, Saakadze served as one of the leading commanders in the shah's ranks from 1621 to 1623. His military exploits led Abbas to appoint him to the staff of Qarachaqay Khan who led a 35,000-strong army to crush the rebellion in Georgia. Saakadze then discovered that the Shah planned to massacre all armed Kartlians, including himself. He conspired with the rebel leaders – his brother-in-law Zurab of Aragvi and king Teimuraz I of Kakheti – and ambushed the Iranian army at Martqopi on March 25, 1625, inflicting a decisive defeat on it. Saakadze went on to annihilate the Turkic nomads transplanted by the Iranian government to replace the exiled Georgian population, dislodged the shah's governor Paykar Khan from Kakheti and raided the Iranian garrisons as far as Ganja and Karabakh. In an act of revenge, Shah Abbas put Saakadze's younger son, Paata, to death, and sent his severed head to the Georgians. The punitive Iranian expedition followed soon thereafter, and won a costly victory over the Georgians at the Battle of Marabda. Saakadze withdrew into the mountains, and organized a powerful guerrilla resistance which forced Abbas I to recognize Teimuraz's royal status.

The unity of Georgian nobles quickly collapsed, however. Saakadze's opposition to Teimuraz's control of Kartli led to a bitter conflict which culminated in the fratricidal battle of Bazaleti in the fall of 1626. The royal army won a victory, driving Saakadze into exile to Istanbul where he entered the service of Sultan Ibrahim I. He briefly served as a governor of the Konya Vilayet and fought against the Iranians at Erzurum (1627-1628), and in Meskheti (1628). However, Grand Vizier Ekrem Hüsrev Pasha soon accused Saakadze of treason and had him, along with his son Avtandil, Kaikhosro, Prince of Mukhrani, and other Georgians, put to death at Constantinople on October 3, 1629.

Saakadze's last surviving son, Ioram, later attained to the princely rank in Georgia, and founded the Tarkhan-Mouravi noble family.

In culture 

Saakadze's controversial career has always been a source of conflicting perceptions of his role in Georgia's history. The traditional historiography of Georgia, heavily influenced by Prince Vakhushti and Marie Brosset, continued to view him as a feudal adventurer and ambitious warlord involved in the turbulent whirl of intrigues and disturbances which fill the history of seventeenth-century Georgia.

The first attempt at the rehabilitation of Saakadze was made by his relative Metropolitan Joseph of Tbilisi in his poem The Grand Mouravi (დიდმოურავიანი, didmouraviani; 1681–87). Beginning from the early 20th century, some Georgian authors have also tried to emphasize the positive aspects of Saakadze's biography, particularly his contribution to the 1625 rebellion which frustrated Shah Abbas's plan to convert eastern Georgian lands into the Qizilbash khanates.

In the 1940s, Joseph Stalin’s wartime propaganda established Saakadze as a major symbol of Georgian patriotism. In October 1940, Stalin commented on Saakadze, proclaiming that the Grand Mouravi’s hopes for Georgia’s "unification into one state through the establishment of royal absolutism and of the liquidation of the power of the princes" had been progressive. In an apparent move to encourage Georgian nationalism in order to gain the loyalty of the population during the war with Germany, Stalin himself was involved in modifying the script for an epic movie, Giorgi Saakadze, commissioned from the Georgian film director Mikheil Chiaureli in 1942-1943. Stalin dismissed a script by the Georgian writer Giorgi Leonidze and approved the one by Anna Antonovskaya and Boris Chenry, adopted from Antonovskaya's 1942 Stalin Prize-winning six-volume novel, The Great Mouravi.

The film emphasized that Saakadze, initially an obscure squire, was a victim of machinations at the hands of the wealthy feudal lords who would sacrifice everything, including their motherland, for their own benefit. It intentionally avoided any mention of Saakadze's own adventures and illustrated him as a popular leader against the external aggressors. In the atmosphere of suspicion and spy mania in the Soviet Union during these years, the movie also served to current propaganda by emphasizing that the treason threatening to the popular leader, and hence to the country, was to be punished cruelly. Ironically, Giorgi Saakadze was also the name of the Wehrmacht's 797th Battalion, one of Georgian battalions formed by the Germans to fight the Soviet Union.

References 

1570s births
1629 deaths
Converts to Islam
Military personnel from Georgia (country)
Nobility of Georgia (country)
People from Georgia (country) murdered abroad
16th-century people from Georgia (country)
17th-century people from Georgia (country)
Executed military personnel
Safavid generals
Georgian emigrants to the Ottoman Empire
17th-century people of Safavid Iran